Prayer for the Living is a 1934 novel by Scottish writer Bruce Marshall.

Plot summary
A witty, engrossing, unique novel about the life of masters and boys in a Scottish prep school.  One way of describing this novel is to say that it is a story of life in a prep school in Scotland during World War I: and that, so far as the bare facts go, is an accurate description. But it is no way at all of conveying to the reader the devilish wit and cutting satire with which Mr. Marshall heightens and brightens the scene, or the pathos surrounding schoolboys who will overnight be turned into soldiers, or the moving idyl of love between the headmaster's daughter and a young student about to leave for the Front.

References

1934 British novels
Novels by Bruce Marshall
Catholic novels
Novels set in Scotland
Novels set during World War I
Novels set in elementary and primary schools